The Continental C90 and O-200 are a family of air-cooled, horizontally opposed, four-cylinder, direct-drive aircraft engines of 201 in³ (3.29 L) displacement, producing between 90 and 100 horsepower (67 and 75 kW).

Built by Continental Motors these engines are used in many light aircraft designs of the United States, including the early Piper PA-18 Super Cub, the Champion 7EC, the Alon Aircoupe, and the Cessna 150.

Though the C90 was superseded by the O-200, and many of the designs utilizing the O-200 had gone out of production by 1980, with the 2004 publication of the United States Federal Aviation Administration light-sport aircraft regulations came a resurgence in demand for the O-200.

Design and development

The C90 was introduced in 1947 as a follow-on to the A65, which had been in production since 1939.
Many of the designs powered by the C90 are upgraded variants of earlier A65 powered designs, such as the Piper J-3 Cub and PA-11 Cub Special, Aeronca 7AC, and Luscombe 8A. The engine was developed from the earlier O-190 by increasing the stroke  inch.

This engine family is considered to be dependable, according to both industry publications and the FAA.

In a cooperative venture, Rolls-Royce produced these same designs in England, under separate certification, with model designations beginning RR, e.g. the Rolls-Royce RR C90-12FH is the equivalent of the Continental C90-12FH; the Rolls-Royce versions are "directly interchangeable with the equivalent models manufactured by Continental."  The Rolls-Royce O-200-A powers the Beagle Pup Series 1, the Rollason Condor, the Bölkow Bo 208 C Junior, the Avions Robin DR 220, the Morane-Saulnier MS-880, plus the Victa Airtourer 100 and the Reims F150 (a version of the Cessna 150 license-built in France by Reims Aviation).

All versions of the C90 and O-200 are four-stroke reciprocating engines and are all similar in size, displacement and weight. These engines are typically fitted with an updraft carburetor, though the C90-8FJ, -12FJ, and -14FJ are equipped with fuel injection systems.  They utilize a redundant ignition system requiring no external power, driving two magnetos, each of which fires one spark plug per cylinder.  Each cylinder has one intake valve and one exhaust valve, pushrod-activated.

Continental's recommended time between overhaul (TBO) for these engines is 1,800 hours of operation or 12 years in service, whichever is reached first.  The standard certification for the C90 and O-200 specifies Avgas 80/87 as the minimum fuel grade. Both are eligible for operation on automobile gasoline on the basis of Supplemental Type Certificates.

While the C90 is approved for takeoff power of 95 horsepower (71 kW) for five minutes, the designation is derived from its continuous power rating of 90 hp (67 kW).  As noted above, certain models of the C90 replace the usual carburetor with a fuel injection system. In addition, there are models which provide for the installation of a controllable-pitch propeller and one, the C90-12FP, designed for a pusher configuration installation. While having slightly less horsepower than the O-200, many floatplane operators prefer the performance of the C90 over the O-200, due to its higher torque at lower rpm. This is primarily due to the C90's camshaft design. The C90 is also known by its military designation of O-205.

The O-200 is an updated and upgraded version of the engine, achieving increased power of 100 hp (75 kW) as a result of higher maximum rpm.  The standard and most common model of the engine is the O-200-A; the -B model is designed for a pusher installation, the -C model provides for the installation of a controllable-pitch propeller, and the -D model is a lower-weight version designed for light-sport aircraft.

Operational history

An engine designated the IOL-200, an O-200 variant modified with fuel injection and liquid cooling, powered the 1986 nonstop, non-refueled global circumnavigation flight of the Rutan Voyager.  The 110-horsepower (82 kW) IOL-200, also referred to as the Voyager 200, was the rear engine and—unlike the forward engine, another modified engine, a Continental O-240 —ran throughout the entire nine-day flight save for a four-minute shutdown due to a fuel problem.

Formula One racer Sharp Nemesis, designed and flown by Jon Sharp, was powered by a 'stock' O-200. Between 1991 and 1999, the aircraft won 45 of the 48 events in which it was entered, as well as winning three Louis Blèriot medals, four Pulitzer Trophies, and setting 16 speed records in its class. In one of those records, Nemesis was clocked at more than 290 mph (467 km/h).  By contrast, the O-200 powered Legend Cub cruises at 95 mph (152.9 km/h).

Variants

Certified versions

C90
C90-8FLacks provisions for generator and starter drives,  continuous,  for take-off.
C90-8FJ continuous,  for take-off.
C90-12FHas provisions for generator and starter drives,  continuous,  for take-off.
C90-12FHHas provisions for generator and starter drives,  continuous,  for take-off.
C90-12FJHas provisions for generator and starter drives,  continuous,  for take-off.
C90-12FPHas provisions for generator and starter drives,  continuous,  for take-off.
C90-14F continuous,  for take-off.
C90-14FH continuous,  for take-off.
C90-14FJ continuous,  for take-off.
C90-16FHas vacuum pump drive provisions,  continuous,  for take-off.

O-200
O-200-AModel for tractor configuration,  continuous
O-200-BModel with special crankshaft and crankcase for pusher configuration,  continuous
O-200-CModel with provisions for a controllable pitch propeller,  continuous
O-200-DSimilar to the "A" model, but with weight reductions,  continuous
O-200-XSimilar to the "D" model except for engine dataplate identification,  continuous

Non-certified versions
O-200-AF UL91 and UL94 95 hp alternate fuel engine.
IOL-200/Voyager 200The aft engine of the round the world flight Rutan Voyager

Applications

Specifications (O-200-A)
Data from Engine specifications:  O-200-A & B.

See also

References

External links

 Teledyne Continental Motors

Boxer engines
1940s aircraft piston engines
O-200